The 12th Parliament of Upper Canada was opened 15 January 1835.  Elections in Upper Canada had been held in October 1834.  All sessions were held at York, Upper Canada.  This parliament was dissolved 28 May 1836 by the new Lieutenant Governor, Sir Francis Bond Head.  Head ordered a new election because the House of Assembly, dominated by reformers, had refused to pass any new money bills.  The assembly also labelled Head a deceitful tyrant after he had invoked his right to consult them (the representatives of the people) only on certain specific matters.  It was succeeded by the 13th Parliament of Upper Canada in November 1836.

The 12th Parliament had two sessions:  15 January, 1835 to 16 April, 1835, and 14 January, 1836 to 20 April, 1836.

Both the House and Parliament sat at the third Parliament Buildings of Upper Canada.

See also
Legislative Council of Upper Canada
Executive Council of Upper Canada
Legislative Assembly of Upper Canada
Lieutenant Governors of Upper Canada, 1791-1841
Historical federal electoral districts of Canada
List of Ontario provincial electoral districts

References

Further reading 
Handbook of Upper Canadian Chronology, Frederick H. Armstrong, Toronto : Dundurn Press, 1985. 

Parliaments of Upper Canada
1835 establishments in Upper Canada
1836 disestablishments in Upper Canada